The 2000 MAC men's basketball tournament, a part of the 1999–2000 NCAA Division I men's basketball season, took place at Gund Arena in Cleveland to determine the Mid-American Conference's automatic bid to the 2000 NCAA tournament. The 2000 tournament was the first MAC Tournament to be held in Cleveland after a four-year stint in Toledo, Ohio, and also marked the first year all conference members were invited to participate after having previously limited participation to the top eight teams in the conference standings. It was a single-elimination tournament with four rounds and the three highest seeds received first-round byes. Bowling Green, the MAC regular season winner, received the number one seed in the tournament.  MAC West Division champion Ball State won the tournament, their 7th conference tournament title and first since 1995.

Tournament

Seeds 
 Bowling Green
 Ball State
 Kent State
 Akron
 Marshall
 Ohio
 Toledo
 Eastern Michigan
 Miami
 Northern Illinois
 Western Michigan
 Buffalo
 Central Michigan

Bracket 

* – Denotes overtime period

References 

Basketball in Cleveland
Mid-American Conference men's basketball tournament
Tournament
MAC men's basketball tournament
Basketball competitions in Cleveland
College baseball tournaments in Ohio
Women's sports in Ohio